Wolves is a documentary short film produced for IMAX and released in 1999.  The film documents the re-introduction of a pack of wolves to a remote region of Idaho.  It was narrated by The Band's Robbie Robertson.

References

External links

1999 films
1990s short documentary films
American short documentary films
Documentary films about nature
Films directed by David Douglas (director)
IMAX short films
Films about wolves
IMAX documentary films
1990s English-language films
1990s American films